USS Gemsbok is a name used more than once by the U.S. Navy:

 was a Civil War gunboat commissioned 30 August 1861
 was a tanker commissioned 3 December 1943

United States Navy ship names